Idlib Governorate ( / ALA-LC: Muḥāfaẓat Idlib) is one of the 14 governorates of Syria. It is situated in northwestern Syria, bordering Turkey's Hatay province to the north, Aleppo Governorate to the east, Hama Governorate to the south, and Latakia Governorate to the west. Reports of its area vary, depending on the source, from 5,933 km2 to 6,097 km2. The provincial capital is Idlib.

In 2011, the governorate was taken over by Syrian rebel militias in the context of the Syrian civil war. In 2017, the governorate came under the nominal control of the Syrian Salvation Government, with Tahrir al-Sham becoming the dominant militia in the region. The governorate saw intense fighting in the 2019 Northwestern Syria offensive and subsequent 2020 offensive, as Syrian government forces advanced deep into rebel territory; by 8 February, only a little more than half of the governorate's territory was reported to still be under rebel control. The remainder of rebel-held territory is dubbed by publications such as Reuters, the BBC and Agence France-Presse as Syria's "last rebel stronghold".

History

Archeological sites
 Al-Dana - site of ancient Adennu
 Bara - ancient site
 Ebla - Bronze Age site
 Serjilla - ancient site
 Tell Touqan - ancient site

Modern Syria (1946–2011)
Idlib Governorate was separated from the neighboring Aleppo Governorate on 17 November 1957, during the reign of President Shukri al-Quwatli. In the early 1980s, the Idlib Governorate was one of the focal points of the Islamist uprising in Syria. Jisr ash-Shugur was the scene of a mass killing by Syrian security forces in 1980. On 9 March 1980, against a background of anti-government protests across Syria, inhabitants of Jisr ash-Shugur marched on the local Ba'ath Party headquarters and set it on fire. The police were unable to restore order and fled. Some demonstrators seized weapons and ammunition from a nearby army barracks. Later that day, units of the Syrian Army Special Forces were helicoptered in from Aleppo to regain control, which they did after pounding the town with rockets and mortars, destroying homes and shops and killing and wounding dozens of people. At least 200 people were arrested. The following day a military tribunal ordered the execution of more than a hundred of the detainees. In all, about 150–200 people were said to have been killed.

Syrian Civil War (2011–present)

Idlib contested by Syrian government and rebels (2011–17)
The Idlib Governorate clashes (September 2011 – March 2012) were violent incidents involving the newly formed Free Syrian Army (FSA) and government-loyal forces, during which the FSA took control of Saraqib, Binnish, Sarmin, Ariha, Zardana, al-Bara and Taftanaz. This included the 10 March Battle of Idlib (2012), a government victory. This led to the April 2012 Idlib Governorate Operation in which the government unsuccessfully sought to regain control. A consequent cease-fire attempt lasted from 14 April to 2 June 2012. This was followed by the Idlib Governorate clashes (June 2012–April 2013), in which the FSA took or regained control of Salqin, Armanaz, Harem, Sarmin, Darkush, Kafr Nabl, Maarrat al-Nu'man and Taftanaz, while government forces maintained control over Jisr ash-Shugur, Fu'ah, Idlib city, Abu al-Duhur airbase and Khan Shaykhun and recaptured Ariha. The Siege of Wadi Deif military base from October 2012 through April 2013 was also broken.

The 2014 Idlib offensive was a series of operations conducted by the rebels against the Syrian Government. The clashes were mostly concentrated around Khan Shaykhun and on the highway towards Maarrat al-Nu'man, and resulted in rebel victory. In the March Battle of Idlib (2015), al-Nusra Front/Army of Conquest-led rebels retook Idlib city from government and Hezbollah forces.

In the Battle of Maarrat al-Nu'man (2016) on 13 March 2016, fighters from the Salafist jihadist groups al-Nusra Front and Jund al-Aqsa launched an overnight attack against the FSA's 13th Division headquarters in the town of Maarrat al-Nu'man to crush local protesters and demonstrations. The battle resulted in a victory for the jihadis. The October 2016 Idlib Governorate clashes were violent confrontations between Jund al-Aqsa and the Syrian rebel group the Ahrar al-Sham, the latter supported by several other rebel groups.

The Idlib Governorate clashes (January–March 2017) were military confrontations between Syrian rebel factions led by Ahrar al-Sham and their allies on one side and the Jabhat Fatah al-Sham (later as Hayat Tahrir al-Sham) and their allies on the other. After 7 February, the clashes also included Jund al-Aqsa as a third belligerent, which had re-branded itself as Liwa al-Aqsa and was attacking the other combatants. The battles were fought in the Idlib Governorate and the western countryside of the Aleppo Governorate.

The Khan Shaykhun chemical attack took place on 4 April 2017, on the town of Khan Shaykhun, then under the control of Hayat Tahrir al-Sham (HTS). The town was struck by an airstrike by government forces, which was followed by massive civilian chemical poisoning. The release of a toxic gas, which included sarin, or a similar substance, killed at least 74 people and injured more than 557, according to the Idlib health authority. The attack was the deadliest use of chemical weapons in the Syrian civil war since the Ghouta chemical attack in 2013. The United Nations, the governments of the United States, United Kingdom, Turkey, Saudi Arabia, France, and Israel, as well as Human Rights Watch have attributed the attack to the forces of Syrian President Bashar al-Assad. The Assad government denied using any chemical weapons in the air strike.

Predominance of rebels like HTS (2017–18) 
The Idlib Governorate clashes (July 2017) were a series of military confrontations between Ahrar al-Sham and Hay'at Tahrir al-Sham. During the clashes, Tahrir al-Sham attempted to capture the Bab al-Hawa Border Crossing. As a result of the clashes, HTS took control of Idlib city, the border crossing, and most of the areas along the Turkish border in the Idlib Province. Clashes resumed in July 2017. In September 2017, the Syrian government and its Russian allies intensified bombing raids against rebel-held towns in Idlib, with multiple casualties. Officially, the campaign to capture areas held by ISIL and the rebels began in October. A Turkish military operation in Idlib Governorate took place in October/November 2017.

As of August 2018, following the end of the Siege of al-Fu'ah and Kafriya, which had been government-held until July 2018, the governorate is almost entirely under the control of the Syrian rebels (primarily the National Front for Liberation, which has over 50,000 fighters) along with Hayat Tahrir al-Sham, with estimated numbers of fighters between 12,000 and 30,000. In September 2018, a demilitarization zone was created on the front between the government and the Turkish-backed opposition, temporarily freezing the conflict.

Government on the rebound (2019–present)
On October 26, 2019, U.S. Joint Special Operations Command (JSOC) conducted a raid in the Idlib province of Syria, on the border with Turkey, that resulted in the death of ISIS leader Abū Bakr al-Baghdadi. The raid was launched after a CIA intelligence effort located him, and conducted during the withdrawal of U.S. forces in northeast Syria, further complicating the operation The Syrian Democratic Forces and Iraqi military also supported the operation; Turkey said it coordinated with the US prior to the mission.

A large portion of the governorate was retaken by government forces during the course of the 2019 offensive, which caused the displacement of nearly a million civilians, and subsequent 2020 offensive, which caused the death of over 1,000 more, often in aerial bombardments. As of March 2020 – if not sooner – rebel control over Idlib Governorate was considered a matter of political survival of the Turkish President Erdoğan. If Idlib falls back into the hands of the Syrian government, the next targets would be the Turkish-controlled zones in northern Syria, and their fall would signal the failings of Erdogan's war against the PKK.

After the value of Syrian currency plummeted, the Turkish lira was adopted as legal tender in the governorate on 15 June 2020.

Geography
Parts of the westernmost regions of the governorate form part of the Al-Ghab Plain, through which the Orontes River flows. The region forms a transitional zone between the forested mountains of the western littoral and the Syrian desert to the east. The Jabal Zawiya highland region lies in the south-central areas of the governorate.

Settlements
Idlib is the provincial capital; other major settlements include Abu al-Duhur, Al Hamdaniyah, Ariha, Harem, Jisr al-Shughur, Kafrsajna, Khan Shaykhun, Ma'arrat al-Nu'man, Salqin, Saraqib and Taftanaz.

Districts

The governorate is divided into five districts (manatiq), which are further divided into 26 sub-districts (nawahi):

 Idlib District (7 sub-districts)
 Idlib Subdistrict
 Abu al-Duhur Subdistrict
 Binnish Subdistrict
 Saraqib Subdistrict
 Taftanaz Subdistrict
 Maarrat Misrin Subdistrict
 Sarmin Subdistrict

 Arihah District (3 sub-districts)
 Ariha Subdistrict
 Ihsim Subdistrict
 Muhambal Subdistrict
 Harem District (6 sub-districts)
 Harem Subdistrict
 Al-Dana Subdistrict
 Salqin Subdistrict
 Kafr Takharim Subdistrict
 Qurqania Subdistrict
 Armanaz Subdistrict

 Jisr al-Shughur District (4 sub-districts)
 Jisr al-Shughur Subdistrict
 Bidama Subdistrict
 Darkush Subdistrict
 Al-Janudiyah Subdistrict
 Ma'arrat al-Numan District (6 sub-districts)
 Ma'arrat al-Nu'man Subdistrict
 Khan Shaykhun Subdistrict
 Sinjar Subdistrict
 Kafr Nabl Subdistrict
 Al-Tamanah Subdistrict
 Hish Subdistrict

Demographics
As per the 2004 Syrian census the population was 1,258,400. A 2011 UNOCHA estimate put the population at 1,501,000, though this has likely changed since the start of the war. The inhabitants are mostly Sunni Muslims, although there is a significant Christian minority.

Gallery

References

 
Governorates of Syria
Syria–Turkey border